In the history of religion and philosophy, deus otiosus (Latin: "inactive god") is a term which refers to the belief in a creator God who has largely or entirely withdrawn from the government of the universe after creating it and is no longer involved in its daily operation, a central tenet of Deism.

Examples in the history of religion 
 In the Sumerian creation myth, the younger gods Enlil and Enki replace the deus otiosus Anu.
 In Greek mythology, the older gods like Uranus and Gaia make way for Cronos and Rhea who in turn are succeeded by the Olympians Zeus and Hera and company.
 In Baltic mythology, the primordial supreme god Deivas most probably was a deus otiosus.
 In Christianity, Protestant reformer Martin Luther used the notion of Deus absconditus (Latin: "hidden God") in order to explain the mystery and remoteness of God.

Ishvara in Nyāya-Vaiśeṣika Hinduism

In the Nyāya-Vaiśeṣika school of Hinduism as well as in the other ancient Indian schools of philosophy, early philosophical and cosmological theories were predominantly atheistic or non-theistic, which postulated that all objects in the physical universe are reducible to paramāṇu (atoms) of substances whose aggregations, combinations, and interactions explained the nature of the universe. In the 1st millennium CE, the Nyāya-Vaiśeṣika school added the concept of Ishvara to its atomistic naturalism. These later Nyāya and Vaiśeṣika atomists retained their belief that substances are eternal, but included the belief in the existence of an Ishvara, which is regarded as the eternal Supreme Being who is also omniscient and omnipresent.

Nyāya and Vaiśeṣika atomists held that the world was created when order was imposed on pre-existing matter: the motion of atoms was ascribed to the agency of a Supreme Being, which did not create the universe out of nothing according to the Nyāya-Vaiśeṣika school. In the 11th century CE, the organization of atoms was cited as a proof for the existence of God by some Nyāya and Vaiśeṣika atomists. According to Klaus Klostermaier, the Nyāya-Vaiśeṣika belief in the existence of an Ishvara mirrors the Western belief in deus otiosus, since both are conceived as a creator God who retires from the universe after having created the laws that govern nature. Klostermaier further states that Ishvara can be understood as an eternal God who co-exists in the universe with eternal substances and atoms, describing it as a divine watchmaker who "winds up the clock, and lets it run its course".

Similarity to Deus absconditus

A similar concept to the one of deus otiosus is that of Deus absconditus (Latin: "hidden God") formulated by two prominent Scholastic and Roman Catholic theologians that lived during the Late Middle Ages: Thomas Aquinas (1225–1274) and Nicholas of Cusa  (1401–1464).

See also
 Anthropology of religion
 Evolutionary origin of religions
 History of religion
 Prehistoric religion
 Comparative mythology
 Deism
 Christian deism
 Moralistic therapeutic deism
 Unmoved mover
 Ethical monotheism
 Fitra
 God gene
 Hanif
 Irreligion
 Agnostic theism
 Nontheism
 Theological noncognitivism
 Naturalistic pantheism
 Nontheistic religion
 Religious naturalism
 Spiritual naturalism
 The One (Neoplatonism)
 Urmonotheismus

References 

Conceptions of God
Deism